Religion in the Marshall Islands has been primarily Christian ever since the religion was introduced by Western missionaries around 1857. The government generally supports the free practice of religion, although the minority Ahmadiyya Muslim community has reported some harassment and discrimination.

Demographics

According to information provided in 2011, major religious groups in the Republic of the Marshall Islands are Protestantism 80.5% (United Church of Christ 47%, Assembly of God 16.2%, Bukot Nan Jesus 5.4%, Full Gospel Churches of the Marshall Islands 3.3%, Reformed Congressional Church 3%, Salvation Army 1.9%, Seventh Day Adventist 1.4%, Meram in Jesus 1.2%, other Protestants 1.1%), Roman Catholic 8.5%, The Church of Jesus Christ of Latter-day Saints (Mormons) 7%, Jehovah's Witnesses 1.7%,  other 1.2%, and persons without any religious affiliation account for a small percentage of the population (1.1%). There are fewer than 20 people who practice the Jewish faith and fewer than 20 members of the Ahmadiyya Muslim Community (2009 est.).

Religious freedom
The constitution of the Marshall Islands establishes the freedom of religion, although it provides that this freedom may be limited by "reasonable restrictions". The constitution further states that no law may discriminate against any person on the basis of religion.

Foreign missionaries are present and operate freely. Religious schools are operated by the Roman Catholic Church, United Church of Christ, Assemblies of God, Seventh-day Adventist Church, Bukot Non Jesus, and the Baptist Church. There are no requirements for religious groups to register with the government, but they may receive tax benefits if they register as non-profits.

There is no religious education in public schools, but school events and government functions typically begin and end with a Christian prayer. According to the government, this is a longstanding practice that is widely accepted in the country. The government provides funding to private religious schools.

The Ahmadiyya Muslim community in the Marshall Islands has reported that it faces difficulties interacting with the government, as well as harassment in general society. Representatives attributed these attitudes to prejudice against Muslims due to perceptions that Islam is linked to terrorism.

History of religious beliefs 

Prior to the arrival of Europeans to the islands, and with them the introduction of Christianity, the Marshallese practiced their own native polytheistic religions.  However, after 1857, which marked the arrival of the Europeans, conversions to Christianity became common in the late 19th century when a large number of Christian missionaries were sent to the islands. Local shrines and places of worship were destroyed and replaced with churches. However despite the influence of Christianity, many of the islanders did not completely discard their indigenous rituals and customs. They practiced a syncretic form of religion that infused the beliefs of both Christianity and their indigenous religions. One example of this syncretic form is the continued use of divinations. "Some Marshallese still practice divination as their ancestors did, but instead of tying knots in leaf strands, they may open the bible and let their finger fall upon a verse at random in the hope that the words will shed light on what they are expected to do". The belief in magic continues to play a (at least) residual role in the daily life of the people of the Marshall Islands.

Indigenous religious beliefs & mythology 
Although polytheistic, the Marshallese indigenous beliefs prior to the introduction of Christianity had one higher god, one higher above the rest. According to James George Frazer, the Marshallese people respected this certain God, and offered him tributes like breadfruit, coconut, fish, etc. In their language, they referred to this deity as Iageach which signifies, "god". Prior to when there was a serious undertaken they would solemnly bring offerings to their gods. Or, if a man would go out in search of food or fishing, he would have to offer something in his family's name to the gods. Some other deities they worshipped included spirits.  It was believed that some types of spirits would appear in dreams or sometimes they possessed a body of a human in order to be seen in the flesh. Some spirits were considered good and some were considered evil. The evil spirits were called Anjilik. These evil spirits were thought to cause disease and sometimes possess the body of humans by stealing the souls out of their bodies. However, most of the spirits honored by indigenous Marshallese religion "...resided at a much lower level."  "They included the spirits of dead relatives who might return at times to possess someone in the family so as to provide valuable information or other assistance." Another category, are nature spirits. Usually these spirits were associated with certain plants or places.  One example might of been a particular spot, or reef that could have been considered dangerous because of the harmful spirits there. To the "Marshallese people, like that of other Micronesians, was filled with dangers, many of them caused by superhuman forces". Although some of these spirits were "fixed" to the spot others could roam widely. Sickness and disease was considered caused by spirits, and "so the most effective remedies for sickness also had to be sought from the spirits". To determine who had caused the sickness and how it could be treated, the " Marshallese turned to the spirits for the knowledge that they were unable to attain on their own". They used different kinds of divinations to try to answer and find a solution on their problems and diseases that afflicted them. One divination was throwing a handful of pebbles on the ground and from their pattern tried to discern the answer to their question. Another type of divination was tying knots randomly in strands of coconut or pandanus leaves and counting the number of knots afterwards to find the answer to their dilemma.

See also 
Roman Catholic Apostolic Prefecture of the Marshall Islands
The Church of Jesus Christ of Latter-day Saints in the Marshall Islands
Baháʼí Faith in the Marshall Islands
Islam in the Marshall Islands

References

External Links & further reading 

https://micronesianseminar.org/article/religion-in-the-marshall-islands/